Omar Mario Pérez Aguado (born September 20, 1976) is a former Uruguayan professional footballer, who last played for Central Español Fútbol Club as a midfielder.

Personal life
He is the oldest brother of Diego Pérez, nicknamed Ruso who last team was Bologna and the Uruguay national football team.

External links
 
 
 
  

1976 births
Living people
Footballers from Montevideo
Uruguayan footballers
Association football midfielders
Central Español players
Club Nacional de Football players
Defensor Sporting players
Centro Atlético Fénix players
Rampla Juniors players
Peñarol players
C.A. Cerro players
Russian Premier League players
FC Rostov players
CD Castellón footballers
Expatriate footballers in Argentina
Expatriate footballers in Ecuador
Expatriate footballers in Russia
Expatriate footballers in Spain
Uruguayan expatriate footballers